Moraly may refer to:
Bernard Moraly (born 1957), French footballer
Yehuda Moraly (born 1948), Israeli academic